A mobile community is a group of people generally united by shared interests or goals who interact:

 considering their context (e.g. time, space, social),
 by means of location-independent information technology,
 and also including mobile access to existing community infrastructures.

See also 

 Community
 Mobile computing
 Mobile identity
 Mobile identity management
 Mobile social network
 Tribe (Internet)

References

Technology in society